Cadours is a commune in the Haute-Garonne department in southwestern France.
The town hosted the Circuit de Cadours between 1948 and 1961.

Population

Monuments

See also
Communes of the Haute-Garonne department

References

Communes of Haute-Garonne